In contrast to the variety of absolute or personal names of God in the Old Testament, the New Testament uses only two, according to the International Standard Bible Encyclopaedia.

With regard to the original documents that were later included, with or without modification, in the New Testament, George Howard put forward in 1977 a hypothesis, not widely accepted, that their Greek-speaking authors may have used some form of the Tetragrammaton (יהוה) in their quotations from the Old Testament but that in all copies of their works this was soon replaced by the existing two names.

Names 
In contrast to the variety of absolute or personal names of God in the Old Testament, the New Testament uses only two, according to the International Standard Bible Encyclopaedia. Of the two, Θεὀς ("God") is the more common, appearing in the text over a thousand times. In its true sense it expresses essential Deity, but by accommodation it is also used of heathen gods. The other is Κύριος ("Lord"), which appears almost 600 times. In quotations from the Old Testament, it represents both יהוה (Yahweh) and אדני (Adonai), the latter name having been used in Jewish worship to replace the former, the speaking of which was avoided even in the solemn reading of sacred texts. No transcription of either of the Hebrew names יהוה and אדני appears in the existing text of the New Testament.

God 
According to Walter A. Elwell and Robert W. Yarbrough, the term θεος (God) is used 1317 times. N. T. Wright differentiates between 'God' and 'god' when it refers to the deity or essentially a common noun. Murray J. Harris wrote that in NA26 (USB3) θεος appears 1,315 times. The Bible Translator reads that "when referring to the one supreme God... it frequently is preceded, but need not be, by the definite article" (Ho theos).

Lord 

The word κύριος appears 717 times in the text of New Testament, and Darrell L. Bock says it is used in three different ways:

Angel of the Lord 
English translations render the phrase either as "an angel of the Lord" or as "the angel of the Lord".

Descriptive titles 

Robert Kysar reports that God is referred to as Father 64 times in the first three Gospels and 120 times in the fourth Gospel. Outside of the Gospels he is called the Father of mercies (2 Corinthians 1:3), the Father of glory (Ephesians 1:17), the Father of mercies (the Father of spirits (Hebrews 12:9), the Father of lights (James 1:17), and he is referred by the Aramaic word Abba in Romans 8:15.

Other titles under which God is referred to include the Almighty (Revelation 1:18), the Most High (Acts 7:48), the Creator (Romans 1:20; 2 Peter 1:4), the Majesty on high (Hebrews 1:3).

Extant New Testament manuscripts 

No extant manuscript of the New Testament, not even a mere fragment, contains the Tetragrammaton in any form.

There is a gap between the original writing down (the autograph) of each of the various documents that were later incorporated into the New Testament and even the oldest surviving manuscript copies of the New Testament form of any such document. Philip Wesley Comfort says: "The time gap between the autograph and the extant copies is quite close − no more than one hundred years for most of the books of the New Testament. Thus we are in a good position to recover most of the original wording of the Greek New Testament.". Scholars assume the general reliability of the texts of ancient authors attested by extremely few manuscripts written perhaps a thouosand years after their death: the New Testament is much better attested both in quantity and in antiquity of manuscripts. On the other hand, Helmut Koester says that the discovered papyri tell us nothing of the history of a text in the 100 to 150 years between when the original autograph was written and when its New Testament form was canonized. In line with the common view, Koester places canonization of the New Testament at the end of the second century. David Trobisch proposes a shorter interval, saying that a specific collection of Christian writings closely approximating the modern New Testament canon was edited and published before 180, probably by Polycarp (69–155).

External links
 Complete Greek text of the New Testament
 Complete Greek text of the Septuagint hyperlinked to Strong's concordance
 Brenton's English translation of the Septuagint
 Brenton's English translation and Greek text in parallel columns
 Instances where the New Testament quotes the Septuagint against the Masoretic Hebrew
 Instances where the New Testament agrees with the Masoretic Hebrew meaning
 Some names in the Septuagint and the Masoretic Text

Names of God
Beliefs and practices of Jehovah's Witnesses
Bible-related controversies
Tetragrammaton
Yahweh